Chaturtha is the biggest community (endogamous group) of Digambara Jains.

Chaturthas are spread all over southern and western Maharashtra and northern Karnataka.

Chaturths are bilinguals, originally Kannada speakers, but now speak Marathi at home.

Maharashtra has the largest population of Jains of any single state in India.

Agriculture was traditionally the primary occupation among Chaturthas, but the increase in education has allowed them to branch out into fields such as teaching, medicine, business, industries, government and private services. Some of them have been Kasar.

Religious head
Bhattarka Jinasena of the Kolhapur Jain Math has traditionally served as the religious authority among the Chaturthas.

Religious organizations
The Dakshin Bharat Jain Sabha is a religious and social service organization of the Jains of South India. The organization is headquartered at Sangli, Maharashtra, India. The association is credited with being one of the first Jain associations to start reform movements among the Jains in modern India. The organization mainly seeks to represent the interests of the native Jains of Maharashtra, Karnataka and Goa.

See also

 Jainism in Mumbai
 Jainism in Maharashtra
 Jainism in North Karnataka
 Jainism in Karnataka
 Acharya Shantisagar
 Acharya Vidyasagar

References 

Social groups of Maharashtra
Jain communities
Karnataka society